Charuymaq may refer to:
Charuymaq County
Charuymaq-e Jonubegharbi Rural District
Charuymaq-e Jonubesharqi Rural District
Charuymaq-e Markazi Rural District
Charuymaq-e Sharqi Rural District
Charuymaq-e Shomalesharqi Rural District